A3010 may refer to:

 A3010 road, one of the A roads in Zone 3 of the Great Britain numbering scheme
 Acorn Archimedes A3010 personal computer
 OnePlus 3T A3010 smartphone
 Shizuoka Railway A3000 series electrical multiple unit train A3010
 GMDD GP40-2LW A3010, a locomotive of the Belfast and Moosehead Lake Railroad (1871–2007)

See also

 3010 (disambiguation)